Rik de Voest was the defending champion but decided not to participate.
Fritz Wolmarans won the final against Bobby Reynolds 6–7(2), 6–3, 7–6(3).

Seeds

Draw

Final four

Top half

Bottom half
{{16TeamBracket-Compact-Tennis3
| RD1=First round
| RD2=Second round
| RD3=Quarterfinals
| RD4=Semifinals

| RD1-seed01=8
| RD1-team01= S Groth
| RD1-score01-1=4
| RD1-score01-2=4
| RD1-score01-3= 
| RD1-seed02= 
| RD1-team02= V Pospisil
| RD1-score02-1=6
| RD1-score02-2=6
| RD1-score02-3= 

| RD1-seed03= 
| RD1-team03=

References
 Main Draw
 Qualifying Draw

Challenger Banque Nationale de Rimouski
Challenger de Drummondville